Nikola Stanjević (fl. 1355–1366) was a magnate who served Emperor Stefan Dušan (r. 1331–55) as veliki vojvoda (general), and who was still alive during the rule of Emperor Uroš V (r. 1355–71), when in 1366 the Emperor confirmed the metochion of his endowment, the Konče Church, dedicated to St. Stephen, near Radovište, to the Hilandar monastery. He held a province in northern Macedonia, around Skopje. He is an ancestor of Nikola Pavlović "Gefalija" and the Stanjević brotherhood in Montenegro. He is the founder of the Stanjevići Monastery on the southern slopes of Mount Lovćen, overlooking Budva.

Gospel
Nikola had a gospel book written and illustrated by monk Feoktist, which he donated to the Hilandar monastery of Mount Athos. The book is now called the "Tetravangelion of Nikola Stanjević", found in London at the British Museum, collection No. 154.

See also
Teodosije the Hilandarian (1246-1328), one of the most important Serbian writers in the Middle Ages
Elder Grigorije (fl. 1310-1355), builder of Saint Archangels Monastery
Antonije Bagaš (fl. 1356-1366), bought and restored the Agiou Pavlou monastery
Lazar the Hilandarian (fl. 1404), the first known Serbian and Russian watchmaker
Pachomius the Serb (fl. 1440s-1484), hagiographer of the Russian Church
 Miroslav Gospel
 Gabriel the Hilandarian
 Constantine of Kostenets
 Cyprian, Metropolitan of Kiev and All Rus'
 Gregory Tsamblak
 Isaija the Monk

References

Sources

People of the Serbian Empire
14th-century rulers in Europe
14th-century Serbian nobility
Generals of Stefan Dušan
Military personnel from Skopje
14th-century Eastern Orthodox Christians
13th-century births
14th-century deaths
Rulers in medieval Macedonia
Boyars of Stefan Dušan